Kasha is a foodstuff.

Kasha may also refer to:

 Places 
 Kasha, Alberta, a locality in Canada
 Kasha, Bukavu, Democratic Republic of the Congo
 Kasha, Iran, a village in Gilan Province, Iran
 Kasha Rud, a village in Iran
 Kasha diza (disambiguation)
 Gasha (Peru), a mountain

Other
Kasha (name)
 Kasha (Pendragon series), a fictional character
 Kasha, a cat-like monster in Japanese mythology
Kasha, an orange feline-like Vexicon counterpart of Zarya Moonwolf, the second Mysticon Ranger, of Mysticons
 Kasha, the original Japanese title of the novel All She Was Worth
 Kasha-Katuwe Tent Rocks National Monument, in New Mexico
 Kasha's rule, a principle in the photochemistry of electronically excited molecules

See also 

 Kascha (disambiguation)
 Kash (disambiguation)
 Kashi (disambiguation)
 Kesha (born 1987), American singer, songwriter, and rapper